Kourou is a commune in French Guiana.

Kourou may also refer to:
 Kourou (river), a river in French Guiana
 Kourou, Burkina Faso, a village
 Kourou (crater), a crater on Mars

See also 
 
 Koru (disambiguation)
 Kuru (disambiguation)